The 1918 College Football All-America team consists of American football players selected to the College Football All-America Teams selected by various organizations for the 1918 college football season.

All-Americans of 1918

Ends

Paul Robeson, Rutgers (WC-1; MS; TM-1)
Bill Fincher, Georgia Tech (MS; TM-1, WC-2)
 Robert Hopper, Penn (WC-1; MS; TM-2)
 William E. Harrington, Pittsburgh (TM-2)
 Josh Weeks, Brown (WC-2)
 Joseph Schwarzer, Syracuse (WC-3)
 John Tressel, Washington & Jefferson (WC-3)

Tackles

Pete Henry, Washington & Jefferson (College and Pro Football Hall of Fame) (WC-2; MS; TM-1)
Leonard Hilty, Pittsburgh (WC-1; TM-2)
Lou Usher, Syracuse (WC-1; TM-2)
Joe Guyon, Georgia Tech (MS)
 Pard Larkin, Swarthmore (TM-1)
 John Ripple, North Carolina A&M (WC-2)
 Angus Goetz, Michigan (WC-3)
 James Neylon, Penn (WC-3)

Guards
Doc Alexander, Syracuse (College Football Hall of Fame) (WC-1; MS; TM-1)
Lyman Perry, Navy (WC-1; MS; TM-1)
 Jake Stahl, Pittsburgh (WC-2; TM-2)
 Alfred Neuschaefer, Rutgers (TM-2)
 Tommy Scaffe, Navy (WC-2)
 Fred Huggins, Brown (WC-3)
 Walter A. Gordon, California (WC-3)

Centers

Bum Day, Georgia Tech (WC-1)
Jack Depler, Illinois (WC-2; MS)
 Thomas Sterck, Washington & Jefferson (TM-1)
 Sam Arthur, Navy (TM-2)
 Tim Callahan, Princeton (WC-3)

Quarterbacks
Frank Murrey, Princeton (WC-1; MS)
 Willard Ackley, Syracuse (WC-3; TM-1)
 Bill Ingram, Navy (TM-2)
 Robb, California (WC-2)

Halfbacks

Tom Davies, Pittsburgh (WC-1; MS; TM-1)
Wolcott Roberts, Navy (WC-1; MS)
 Katy Easterday, Pittsburgh (TM-1)
 Buck Flowers, Georgia Tech (WC-2 [fb]; TM-2)
 Skip Gougler, Pittsburgh (TM-2)
 Frankie Frisch, Fordham (WC-2)
 Gus Eckberg, Minnesota (WC-3)
 Frank Kelley, Rutgers (WC-3)

Fullbacks
Frank Steketee, Michigan (WC-1; TM-2)
George McLaren, Pittsburgh (WC-2 [hb]; MS; TM-1)
 William Butler, Navy (WC-3)

Key
NCAA recognized selectors for 1918
 WC = Walter Camp
 MS = Frank Menke Syndicate, by Frank G. Menke

Other selectors
 TM = Robert "Tiny" Maxwell, of the Philadelphia Public Ledger

Bold = Consensus All-American
 1 – First-team selection
 2 – Second-team selection
 3 – Third-team selection

See also
 1918 All-Big Ten Conference football team

References

All-America Team
College Football All-America Teams